Emil Darjes was a Luftwaffe fighter pilot in World War 2. He was a member of the German Luftwaffe and collected a total of 82 confirmed kills. He was a part of the unit JG 54, known for their symbol The Green Heart.

References

German World War II flying aces